Rozes  may refer to:

Rozès, a commune in France
Rozes (musician) (born 1993), American musician

See also
 Roze (disambiguation)
 Roses (disambiguation)